Ælfric was a medieval Bishop of Elmham.

Ælfric was consecrated before 970 and died sometime after that year.

Notes

References

External links
 
 Anglo-Saxon charters: S 776 (AD 970) and S 779 (AD 970).

Bishops of Elmham